Eltek is a global electric power conversion specialist that develops and markets systems for telecommunications and industrial applications. The company is based in Drammen, Norway. As of 2018 it has approximately 2000 employees, with offices in 40 countries.

History
ELTEK is a Norwegian-based company that specializes in designing, manufacturing, and distributing power solutions for various industrial and commercial applications. Founded in 1971, the company initially focused on manufacturing electronic equipment for the military, but later expanded its product line to include power supplies for various applications. In the 1990s, ELTEK shifted its focus to the rapidly growing telecommunications industry and found great success. Today, the company operates in over 100 countries and serves customers in a variety of industries, including telecom, data center, power utilities, and transportation. 

In 1998,The company was listed was listed on the Oslo Stock Exchange. under the name Eltek ASA. In 2007 the company bought the Texas-based Valere Power.

In 2015, Eltek ASA was acquired by Delta Electronics, was delisted from the Oslo Stock Exchange, and changed its name to Eltek Power Systems AS. It is now simply known as Eltek, and continues as a division of Delta Group.

References

Engineering companies of Norway
Companies based in Drammen
Electronics companies established in 1970
Companies formerly listed on the Oslo Stock Exchange
2015 mergers and acquisitions
1970 establishments in Norway